Joey Kirk (born August 21, 1965 in Santa Monica, California) is a former U.S. soccer forward who spent most of his career playing indoor soccer.  He earned seven caps with the U.S. national team in 1987 and 1988.

College
Kirk attended Cal-State Northridge where he starred on the men's soccer team from 1983 to 1987.  In 1987, he received Division II first team All American recognition and finished his career with 59 goals, a school record.

Professional career
In 1987, Kirk joined the California Kickers of the Western Soccer Alliance (WSA) during the collegiate off season.  The Kickers finished the season in last place with a 4-6 record.  In 1988, the Wichita Wings of Major Indoor Soccer League drafted Kirk and he spent the next two seasons (1988–1990) with the team.  In 1989, he spent the summer with the Los Angeles Heat of the WSA, now known as the Western Soccer League.  In 1990, he joined the Ottawa Intrepid of the Canadian Soccer League. In 1990, Kirk moved from the Wings to the Milwaukee Wave of the National Professional Soccer League (NPSL).  In the 1991–1992 season, he scored fifty goals in forty games for the Wave.  Kirk began the 1993–1994 season with Milwaukee before being traded to the Detroit Rockers for Eloy Salgado in February 1993.  He remained in Detroit through the 1994–1995 season.

While Kirk had concentrated on indoor soccer for several years, in 1994, he joined the expansion Milwaukee Rampage of USISL for the 1994 and 1995 outdoor seasons.  In 1994, he scored twenty-four goals in eighteen games with the Rampage.

In 1995, Kirk moved to the Chicago Power of the NPSL.  He was with them through at least February 1996.  However, some time before the playoffs, the Power traded Kirk to the St. Louis Ambush.

In February 1996, Kirk was drafted by the Los Angeles Galaxy of Major League Soccer (MLS) in the sixth round (54th overall) of the Inaugural MLS Draft.  However, he did not join the Galaxy until May because he was with the Ambush in the NPSL playoffs.   Kirk was then injured in the playoffs and reported to the Galaxy unable to play.  The Galaxy waived Kirk on May 6, 1996 without him seeing time in a game.

In August, Kirk signed with the Sacramento Knights of the Continental Indoor Soccer League (CISL).  In 1997, he moved to the Detroit Safari  of CISL, but the team and the league folded at the end of the season.  That fall, Kirk moved to the Philadelphia KiXX of the NPSL.  In the 1999 off season, the Wings purchased Kirk's contract from the KiXX.

National team
Kirk earned his first cap with the U.S. national team in a June 12, 1987 loss to South Korea in Pusan.  At the time Kirk had just finished college.  His next game came in another loss, this time to Guatemala on January 10, 1988.  Kirk's last game with the national team came in a scoreless tie with Ecuador on June 12, 1988.

In 1997, Kirk traveled with the U.S. Futsal team to the 1997 FIFUSA World Futsal Championship where the U.S. finished 20 out of 20 teams.

Coaching
Since retiring from playing, Kirk has coached youth soccer with several clubs in California.

Recognition
Kirk was inducted into the Cal State Northridge Matadors Hall of Fame in July 2016.

References

External links
 MISL stats
 All Time Milwaukee Wave records

1966 births
Living people
American soccer coaches
American soccer players
Cal State Northridge Matadors men's soccer players
California Kickers players
Chicago Power players
Continental Indoor Soccer League players
Detroit Rockers players
Detroit Safari players
Los Angeles Heat players
Major Indoor Soccer League (1978–1992) players
Milwaukee Wave players
National Professional Soccer League (1984–2001) players
Philadelphia KiXX (NPSL) players
Sacramento Knights players
St. Louis Ambush (1992–2000) players
United States men's international soccer players
Western Soccer Alliance players
Wichita Wings (MISL) players
Wichita Wings (NPSL) players
People from Granada Hills, Los Angeles
Association football forwards
Ottawa Intrepid players